The Dessau tramway network is a network of tramways forming part of the public transport system in Dessau-Roßlau, a city in the federal state of Saxony-Anhalt, Germany.

Since 2016 only two lines in operation, lines 1 and 3.

See also
List of town tramway systems in Germany
Trams in Germany

References

External links

 
 

Dessau
Dessau
Transport in Saxony-Anhalt
Dessau